Goënga is a village in Súdwest-Fryslân municipality in the province of Friesland, the Netherlands. It had a population of around 240 in January 2017.

History
The village was first mentioned in 13th century as Goingum, and means "settlement of the people of Goaije". Goënga is a terp (artificial living hill) village from the middle ages. It was located to the east of the former Middelzee. It was connected to Sneek via a canal.

The Dutch Reformed church dates from 1758 and has a tower from 1787 which contains a bell from 1342 made by Stephanus. The former clergy house has been turned into a private house.

Goënga was home to 183 people in 1840. Before 2011, the village was part of the Wymbritseradiel municipality. Nowadays it a part of the Súdwest-Fryslân.

Gallery

References

Súdwest-Fryslân
Populated places in Friesland